Tom Clancy's Op-Center: Mirror Image (also called Op-Center: Mirror Image) is the second novel in Tom Clancy's Op-Center created by Tom Clancy and Steve Pieczenik first published in 1995. The actual novels are written by Jeff Rovin.

Plot
The Cold War is over. And chaos is setting in. The new president of Russia is trying to create a democratic regime. But there are strong elements within the country that are trying to stop him: the ruthless Russian mafia, the right-wing nationalists, and those nefarious forces that will do whatever it takes to return Russia to the days of the Czar.

Op-Center, the newly founded but highly successful crisis management team, begins a race against the clock and against the hardliners. Their task is made even more difficult by the discovery of a Russian counterpart... but this one's controlled by those same repressive hardliners and represents the opposite of everything Op-Center stands for. Two rival Op-Centers, virtual mirror images of each other. But if this mirror cracks, it'll be more than seven years of bad luck.

Mirror Image
American thriller novels
Techno-thriller novels
1995 American novels
Novels set in Russia
Novels set in the Commonwealth of Independent States
Berkley Books books